is a former Japanese football player. His father Isao Yamase participated in the 1984 Winter Olympics as a biathlete. His elder brother Koji is also a footballer.

Playing career
Yamase moved to Tosu in April 2009 on a loan contract from Yokohama F. Marinos. Yamase is a Left footed attacking player that can play as a central attacking midfielder, second striker or left attacker. He is known in Japan to have a very powerful  left shot and has scored many goals from distance.

Club statistics

J1 League Firsts
 Appearance: May 8, 2005. Yokohama F. Marinos 1 vs 0 Sanfrecce Hiroshima, Hiroshima Big Arch
 Goal: April 14, 2007. Yokohama F. Marinos 5 vs 0 Oita Trinita, Nissan Stadium

References

External links

1984 births
Living people
Association football people from Hokkaido
Sportspeople from Sapporo
Japanese footballers
J1 League players
J2 League players
Yokohama F. Marinos players
Sagan Tosu players
Kataller Toyama players
FC Osaka players
Association football midfielders